Roll On is the eighth studio album by American country music band Alabama, released in 1984.

All four singles released from this album reached Number One on the Hot Country Singles chart: "Roll On (Eighteen Wheeler)", "When We Make Love", "If You're Gonna Play in Texas (You Gotta Have a Fiddle in the Band)" and "(There's A) Fire in the Night". Music videos were made for "I'm Not That Way Anymore" and "(There's A) Fire in the Night".

The album was certified quadruple platinum by the Recording Industry Association of America. The album reached No. 1 on the Billboard Country Albums chart and No. 21 on the Billboard 200.

Track listing

Personnel

Alabama
 Randy Owen: electric guitar, lead vocals
 Teddy Gentry: bass guitar, background vocals, lead vocals (9)
 Jeff Cook: electric guitar, organ, background vocals, lead vocals (8)
 Mark Herndon: drums

Additional musicians
 Jack Eubanks: acoustic guitar
 Gregg Galbraith: electric guitar
 Carl Jackson: banjo
 George "Leo" Jackson: acoustic guitar
 Shane Keister: keyboards
 Farrell Morris: percussion
 Fred Newell: electric guitar
 Larry Paxton: bass guitar
 Willie Rainsford: keyboards
 Larry Shell: acoustic guitar
 Milton Sledge: drums
 Blaine Sprouse: fiddle

Strings by the "A" Strings, arranged by Kristin Wilkinson

Charts and certifications

Weekly charts

Year-end charts

Certifications

References

1984 albums
RCA Records albums
Alabama (American band) albums
Albums produced by Harold Shedd